The Église Saint-Cannat is a Roman Catholic church in Marseille.

Location
It is located in the 1st arrondissement of Marseille. The exact address is 4, rue des Prêcheurs, 13001 Marseille.

History
The church was named in honour of Canus Natus, a French Roman Catholic Saint from the fifth century.

Construction of the church building started on December 31, 1526, in the presence of Bernardin des Beaux. It was dedicated on May 18, 1619.

The facade was built from 1739 to 1744 by architect Joseph Gérard.

The church has a few works of art. Two paintings by Michel Serre (1658-1733) are displayed in the church: La vierge à l'enfant et le purgatoire and La purification de la Vierge. There is also a painting by Pierre Parrocel (1664–1739), representing the baptism of Christ. Additionally, one can see a sculpture of Saint Thérèse of Lisieux (1873–1897) designed by François Carli (1872-1957).

The pipe organ, designed by Jean-Esprit Isnard (1707-1781), dates back to 1747.

The church building has been listed as a Monument historique since November 2, 1926.

At present
The church building is open on Mondays and Thursdays from 9AM to 1PM, on Wednesdays from 9AM to 7PM, and on Tuesday and Fridays from 9AM to 12PM. However, no Mass are said at present.

Gallery

References

Roman Catholic churches in Marseille
17th-century Roman Catholic church buildings in France
Roman Catholic churches completed in 1619
Monuments historiques of Marseille
Dominican churches
1619 establishments in France